Prathamesh Maulingkar (born 4 April 1991 in Tivim) is an Indian model and a former footballer. He won the title of Mister Supranational in 2018. He had played as a centre back for Dempo in the I-League. Maulingkar is the first footballer in Asia to be featured on the cover of Men's Health magazine. He also works as a fitness trainer and owns a gym in the state of Goa.

Career

Youth career
Maulingkar hails from Tivim, a village near the Northern Goan town of Mapusa, Prathamesh had ambitions of being a cricketer. He showed the qualities of a footballer only in the teen years and made it to the Dempo U-16 team. He represented the state of Goa in the U-19 junior nationals. Playing against boys of same age group from other states, he realized that he has the potential to play along with the best in the country. Since then, he had focused only on his career in football. During this time he remained in Dempo youth team, represented them at U-19 level. He was also called up for India U-19 camp.

Pailan Arrows
Maulingkar made his Pailan Arrows debut on 6 November 2011 against Dempo in the I-League. Maulingkar scored his first goal of the 2012–13 season against Churchill Brothers on 9 January 2013 at the Duler Stadium in which Pailan Arrows lost the match 3–1.

Dempo
On 18 January 2013 it was confirmed that Maulingkar had signed for reigning champions Dempo of the I-League on loan for the rest of the season with the option to sign him permanently at the end of the season. He then made his debut for the club on 28 March 2013 against Pune in which he started and played for one full half before being subbed-off at half-time as Dempo went on to lose the match 2–0.

Pageants/TV Shows
In 2015, Prathamesh participated in MTv Splitsvilla Season 8 hosted by Rannvijay Singh and Sunny Leone, which aired on MTV channel.

He participated in the 9th edition of Mister India contest. On the final gala held on 14 December 2017 in Mumbai, he won the title of Peter England Mr. India Supranational 2018. He represented India at the Mister Supranational 2018 pageant in Krynica-Zdrój, Poland where he was declared as the winner. He also won the Best Body award in the competition. Prathamesh is the first Asian to win the title of Mister Supranational.

International

Maulingkar made his India U23 debut against Iraq U23 on 25 June 2012 during qualification for the 2013 AFC U-22 Asian Cup playing the full 90 minutes but drawing a yellow card in the 14th minute.

Television

Career statistics

Club
Statistics accurate as of 12 May 2013

References

1991 births
Living people
Footballers from Goa
I-League players
Indian Arrows players
Dempo SC players
Association football central defenders
People from North Goa district
Indian footballers